Paul Nathaniel Barman (born October 30, 1974), better known by his stage name MC Paul Barman, is an American rapper. He resides in Manhattan, New York. In 2012, LA Weekly placed him at number 14 on the "Top 20 Whitest Musicians of All Time" list.

Early life
Barman is from Ridgewood, New Jersey. He is Jewish. He attended Brown University.

Career
MC Paul Barman released his debut EP, It's Very Stimulating, on Wordsound in 2000; it was produced by Prince Paul.

His first studio album, Paullelujah!, was released on Coup d'État in 2002.

He released his second studio album, Thought Balloon Mushroom Cloud, on Househusband in 2009.

He has toured with Blackalicious. He has taught a hip hop class to high school kids at the Bank Street College of Education.

In 2018, he released (((Echo Chamber))), his first studio album since 2009's Thought Balloon Mushroom Cloud, on Mello Music Group. It included productions from MF Doom, Questlove, and Mark Ronson, as well as guest appearances from Open Mike Eagle and Masta Ace.

Musical style and influences
The New York Times called his music "a surreal departure from the rap norm". His music has been influenced by Boogie Down Productions, Jungle Brothers, Wu-Tang Clan, MC Lyte, and De La Soul.

Discography
Studio albums
 Paullelujah! (Coup d'État, 2002)
 Thought Balloon Mushroom Cloud (Househusband, 2009)
 (((Echo Chamber))) (Mello Music Group, 2018)

Collaborative albums
 A Year of Octobers (2021) 

Mixtapes
 Full Buck Moon Kaboom (Househusband, 2008)
 Blue Moon Kaboom (Househusband, 2017)

EPs
 It's Very Stimulating (Wordsound, 2000)

Singles
 "Postgraduate Work" (Househusband, 1998)
 "How Hard Is That?" (Matador, 2000)
 "Cock Mobster" (Coup d'État, 2001)
 "Father Moose" (Househusband, 2009)
 "Decide-A-Tron" (Househusband, 2017)
 "Happy Holidays" (Mello Music Group/Househusband, 2017)
 "Leapfrog" (Mello Music Group, 2018)

Guest appearances
 Deltron 3030 - "Meet Cleofis Randolph the Patriarch" from Deltron 3030 (2000)
 MF Doom - "Hot Guacamole" from MM..LeftOvers (2004)
 Mr. Dead - "Chemically Imbalanced" from Metabolics Volume II: Dawn of the Dead (2001)
 Masta Ace - "Roommates Meet" from Disposable Arts (2001)
 DJ Yoda - "Salvation Barmy" from How to Cut and Paste Mix Tape Vol.1 (2001)
 Le Hammond Inferno - "Man from Lafonda (Paul Barman Remix)" from This Is Bungalow (2004)
 Prince Paul - "Inside Your Mind" and "The Night My Girlfriend Left Me" from Itstrumental (2005)
 DJ Yoda - "Salaam" from The Amazing Adventures of DJ Yoda (2006)
 Rushden & Diamonds - "We Want Rushden" and "Money" from 2010 (2010)
 Open Mike Eagle - "Exiled from the Getalong Gang" from Rappers Will Die of Natural Causes (2011)
 Open Mike Eagle - "Starz" from 4nml Hsptl (2012)
 Memory Man - "Live from Death Row" from Broadcast One (2015)
 Open Mike Eagle - "Trickeration" from A Special Episode of (2015)
 L'Orange and Kool Keith - "Suspended Animation" from Time? Astonishing! (2015)
 Prince Paul - "Girls Wanna Do Me, Guys Wanna Be My Friend" from The Redux (2017)
 Donwill - "Don, Rob, and Paul" from One Word No Space (2019)

References

External links
 
 
 

1974 births
Living people
Brown University alumni
Jewish American musicians
Jewish rappers
Matador Records artists
Mello Music Group artists
People from Ridgewood, New Jersey
Rappers from New Jersey
East Coast hip hop musicians
21st-century American rappers
21st-century American Jews